Waiting for Rain is a 2021 South Korean-American drama film directed by Jo Jin-mo and written by Yoo Seong-hyub. The film starring Kang Ha-neul and Chun Woo-hee, is a love story between a man and a woman who have yearned for each other for a long time but could not meet due to certain circumstances. The film was released in South Korea on April 28, 2021, in USA on April 30, 2021, and in Taiwan on May 7, 2021.

Synopsis
Waiting for Rain follows the romance between Young-ho (Kang Ha-neul) and So-hee (Chun Woo-hee). The two become each other's sources of comfort through the connection of a chance letter and make the unlikely promise of meeting up on a rainy December 31. The movie has an “analog” vibe through its depiction of the exchange of handwritten letters rather than phone calls or text messages.

Cast
 Kang Ha-neul as Park Young-ho, a young student taking his second gap year, who sends his first love So-yeon a letter after reminiscing about her.
 Chun Woo-hee as Gong So-hee, a woman who receives the letter in place of her older sister So-yeon, who is ill, and she sends Young-ho a reply with a few rules.
 Choi Myung-bin as Young Gong So-hee
Lee Seol as Gong So-yeon, she is struggling with illness and is living a limited life. She is Sohee's older sister.
Kang Young-seok as Bookworm, he is a man who likes books better than people. He is in a bookstore run by Sohee's mother every day.
Lim Ju-hwan as Park Young-hwan, he is Youngho's older brother.
Lee Yang-hee as Young-ho's father
Lee Hang-na as So-hee's mother, She runs a bookstore.
Kang So-ra as Soo-jin, she is Youngho's motive for re-study. For Youngho, Soyeon is like a 'rain' that gives comfort and comfort, while Sujin is like a brightly shining'star'.

Production
On December 12, 2019, it was reported that Kang Ha-neul and Chun Woo-hee received an offer to appear in the film and both accepted.

Filming began in March 2020. Filming was completed in July 2020.

Release
The film was released in South Korea on April 28, 2021, in USA on April 30, 2021, and in Taiwan on May 7, 2021.

Reception
The film was released on April 28, 2021 on 952 screens. It was at the number 1 place at the Korean box office, on the opening day of its release, collecting 29,853 audience with a cumulative audience of 31,400 including its premiere.  It maintained its number 1 spot on its opening weekend with a total audience of 122,261 from April 30 to May 2, 2021, therefore, recording a total of 174,742 admissions.  On May 10, two weeks after its release, it reached the 300,000 admissions mark garnering a cumulative audience of 304,780.

References

External links
 
 
 

2020s Korean-language films
South Korean drama films
American drama films
2021 films
2021 drama films
Films set in Seoul
Films set in Busan
Films set in bookstores
Films about postal systems
Films set in 2003
Films set in 2011
Films set in the 2000s
Columbia Pictures films